Eayrestown is an unincorporated community located within Lumberton Township in Burlington County, New Jersey, United States. The settlement is named for Richard and Elizabeth Eayres, the first settlers of the site in the 1600s. It was also the first settlement in what is now Lumberton Township. The settlement, located along the South Branch Rancocas Creek, was the site of numerous saw and gristmills early in its history and a picnic grove that attracted people from around the area. Today, numerous farms and housing developments dot the area.

References

Lumberton Township, New Jersey
Unincorporated communities in Burlington County, New Jersey
Unincorporated communities in New Jersey